Mark Reilly is a footballer.

Mark Reilly may also refer to:

Mark Reilly (musician) in Matt Bianco
Mark Reilly, host on Collider (website)

See also
Mark Riley (disambiguation)